Patrick Frary (born 24 December 1953) is an English professional wrestling trainer, promoter, owner, and former professional wrestler, better known by his ring name "Rowdy" Ricky Knight. He is the owner of the World Association of Wrestling promotion in Norwich.

Professional wrestling career
Knight was working as a bouncer when he first met professional wrestler Jimmy Ocean. Ocean trained Knight, and the duo formed a tag team. Throughout the 1990s, they teamed together as The Superflys on the British circuit. The team was managed by Knight's wife Sweet Saraya. The Superflys wrestled in All Star Wrestling, holding the British Open Tag Team Championship four times together.

Knight, Sweet Saraya, and Jimmy Ocean formed the World Association of Wrestling in 1994 in Norwich. Ocean left the business one year later. The promotion also included a wrestling school, The WAW Academy, which trained Roy Knight and The UK Pitbulls. The WAW Academy is Europe's longest running wrestling school. As a member of the roster, Knight has held the WAW World Heavyweight Championship one time. He also held the WAW Tag Team Championship with Ocean.

Personal life
Knight was in prison for eight years, mostly due to violent offences.

Knight is married to Julia Bevis, who wrestles under the name Sweet Saraya. They have two children, and he has two other from a previous marriage. His sons Roy Knight and Zak Zodiac wrestle on the British wrestling circuit as the UK Hooligans. Their daughter Paige wrestled for WWE, winning the NXT Women's Championship and the WWE Divas Championship twice before retiring due to a serious neck injury. The family was featured in The Wrestlers: Fighting with My Family, a 2012 documentary. The documentary was adapted into a feature film, Fighting with My Family, by Dwayne Johnson's production company Seven Bucks Productions. The film was directed by Stephen Merchant, with Nick Frost playing the role of Knight, and premiered at the Sundance Film Festival in 2019.

Championships and accomplishments
All Star Wrestling
British Open Tag Team Championship (4 times) - with Jimmy Ocean
DAM Promotions
DAM Heavyweight Championship (1 time)
Extreme World Wrestling
EWW St George's Championship (1 time)
Herts and Essex Wrestling
HEW Heavyweight Championship (2 times)
HEW Tag Team Championship (3 times) - with Jimmy Ocean(1), Chuck Cyrus(1), and Karl Kramer(1)
Independent Pro Wrestling Germany
IPW Senior Championship (1 time)
Playhouse Wrestlefest
Wrestlefest Tag Team Championship (1 time) - with Zack Zodiac
Premier Promotions
PWF Heavyweight Championship (1 time)
PWF Mid-Heavyweight Championship (1 time)
PWF Tag Team Championship (1 time) - with Roy Knight
 Pro Wrestling Illustrated
 Ranked No. 457 of the top 500 singles wrestlers in the PWI 500 in 2019
Real Deal Wrestling
RDW British Heavyweight Championship (1 time)
RDW Tag Team Championship (1 time) - with Zak Zodiac
The Wrestling Alliance
British Heavyweight Championship (1 time)
British Open Tag Team Championship (1 time) - with Roy Knight
World Association of Wrestling
WAW World Heavyweight Championship (1 time)
WAW Hardcore Championship (1 time)
WAW World Tag Team Championship (1 time) - with Jimmy Ocean
WAW Pontins Open Championship (1 time)
Easter Area Championship (1 time)
World Wide Wrestling League
W3L Heavyweight Championship (1 time)
X Wrestling Alliance
British Inter-Federation Cup (2007) - with Jo FX, Kraft, and Zack Zodiac

References

English male professional wrestlers
Sportspeople from Norwich
1953 births
Living people
20th-century professional wrestlers